Salvador Moya may refer to:
Salvador Moyà-Solà (born 1955), Spanish paleontologist
Salvi Moya (born 1996), Spanish footballer